Tor Arne Hetland (born 12 January 1974) is a Norwegian cross-country skiing coach and a former professional cross-country skier.

Hetland was born in Stavanger. He now lives in Trondheim. While active he represented Byåsen IL ski club. He was coached by Ulf Morten Aune.

World Cup career
Hetland began his career in 1990, but only started competing in the World Cup in 1996/97, where he finished 11th in the long distance standings and 46th in the sprint, finishing 30th in the overall standings. The year after he did much worse, coming 42nd in the long distance, and 78th in the sprint, finishing 62nd overall. For the next three seasons he improved his overall standing and became a main contender in the sprint. In 1998/99 he came second in the sprints, and 23rd in the overall, in 1999/2000 he came fourth in the sprints but had a better long distance season than the one before, and in 2000/01 he came third in the sprints and 12th overall. In 2001/02 he came 13th in the overall standing, whilst finishing the sprint in sixth, and in 2003/04 he came fourth in the sprint, and claimed his first distance points, coming in 37th, and 14th in the overall. The following season, 2004/05, was Hetland's most successful year to date, winning the sprint title, and coming third in the overall standings.

Hetland finished the 2005/06 FIS World Cup season in third place, 259 points behind Tobias Angerer, and 7 points behind fellow countryman Jens Arne Svartedal. He finished third in the sprints, 163 points behind Björn Lind, and 20 points behind Thobias Fredriksson. He was 20th in the distance standings, 632 points behind Angerer.

Hetland has had 23 podium finishes in his World Cup career, 10 in first place, 10 in second place and three in third place. He has podiumed at least once every season since 1996/97, except for 1997/98 and 1999/2000. The most podium finishes he has had in one season was in 2004/05 when he had five. He had four in 2005/06 and three for three consecutive seasons from 2000/01. Of his 23 podium finishes all but three have come in sprints. His first non sprint podium was in 1996/97, when he came second in a 50 km race. In 2000/01 he came third in a 15 km race and on 19 November 2005 he won his first distance race (15 km) in Beitostølen, Norway. The victory on this particular course was no great shock as the Beitostølen track is very flat as the tracks on the cross country circuit goes, and when taken into consideration that the Norwegian athletes, much like the larger teams like the Germans and Russians, are expected to be in near top condition at the beginning of the season so as to secure team selection. His victory in the sprint event in Vernon, Canada on 12 December 2005, was his 100th career race.

Retirement
Hetland announced his retirement the week of 27 April 2009 to a lingering knee injury and asthma. He stated that he "...[felt]... like I am quitting like I am top".

Cross-country skiing results
All results are sourced from the International Ski Federation (FIS).

Olympic Games
 2 medals – (1 gold, 1 silver)

World Championships
 5 medals – (3 gold, 1 silver, 1 bronze)

World Cup

Season titles
 1 title – (1 sprint)

Season standings

Individual podiums
 13 victories (11 , 2 ) 
 35 podiums (30 , 5 )

Team podiums

 12 victories – (8 , 4 ) 
 24 podiums – (15 , 9 )

References

 FIS Newsflash 229. 29 April 2009. - accessed 30 April 2009.

External links
 

Norwegian male cross-country skiers
1974 births
Living people
Sportspeople from Stavanger
Olympic cross-country skiers of Norway
Cross-country skiers at the 1998 Winter Olympics
Cross-country skiers at the 2002 Winter Olympics
Cross-country skiers at the 2006 Winter Olympics
Olympic gold medalists for Norway
Olympic silver medalists for Norway
Olympic medalists in cross-country skiing
FIS Nordic World Ski Championships medalists in cross-country skiing
Tour de Ski skiers
Medalists at the 2006 Winter Olympics
Medalists at the 2002 Winter Olympics
Norwegian cross-country skiing coaches